English phonology refers to the system of speech sounds that are used in spoken English. Like many other languages, English has wide variation in pronunciation, both historically and from dialect to dialect. In general, however, the regional dialects of English share a largely similar (but not identical) phonological system. Among other things, most dialects have vowel reduction in unstressed syllables and a complex set of phonological features that distinguish fortis and lenis consonants (stops, affricates, and fricatives).

Phonological analysis of English often concentrates on or uses, as a reference point, one or more of the prestige or standard accents, such as Received Pronunciation for England, General American for the United States, and General Australian for Australia. Nevertheless, many other dialects of English are spoken, which have developed independently from these standardized accents, particularly regional dialects. Information about these standardized accents functions only as a limited guide to all of English phonology, which one can later expand upon once one becomes more familiar with some of the many other dialects of English that are spoken.

Phonemes
A phoneme of a language or dialect is an abstraction of a speech sound or of a group of different sounds which are all perceived to have the same function by speakers of that particular language or dialect. For example, the English word through consists of three phonemes: the initial "th" sound, the "r" sound, and a vowel sound. The phonemes in this and many other English words do not always correspond directly to the letters used to spell them (English orthography is not as strongly phonemic as that of many other languages).

The number and distribution of phonemes in English vary from dialect to dialect, and also depend on the interpretation of the individual researcher. The number of consonant phonemes is generally put at 24 (or slightly more depending on the dialect). The number of vowels is subject to greater variation; in the system presented on this page there are 20–25 vowel phonemes in Received Pronunciation, 14–16 in General American and 19–21 in Australian English. The pronunciation keys used in dictionaries generally contain a slightly greater number of symbols than this, to take account of certain sounds used in foreign words and certain noticeable distinctions that may not be—strictly speaking—phonemic.

Consonants 
The following table shows the 24 consonant phonemes found in most dialects of English, plus , whose distribution is more limited. The alveolars are usually apical, i.e. pronounced with the tip of the tongue touching or approaching the roof of the mouth, though some speakers produce them laminally, i.e. with the blade of the tongue.

Consonant examples
The following table shows typical examples of the occurrence of the above consonant phonemes in words, using minimal pairs where possible.

Sonorants
 The pronunciation of  varies by dialect:
 Received Pronunciation has two main allophones of : the clear or plain  (the "light L"), and the dark or velarized  (the "dark L"). The clear variant is used before vowels when they are in the same syllable, and the dark variant when the  precedes a consonant or is in syllable-final position before silence.
 In South Wales, Ireland, and the Caribbean,  is usually clear, and in North Wales, Scotland, Australia, and New Zealand it is usually dark.
 In General American and Canada,  is generally dark, but to varying degrees: before stressed vowels it is neutral or only slightly velarized. In southern U.S. accents it is noticeably clear between vowels, and in some other positions.
 In urban accents of Southern England, as well as New Zealand and some parts of the United States,  can be pronounced as an approximant or semivowel at the end of a syllable (l-vocalization).
 Depending on dialect,  has at least the following allophones in varieties of English around the world (see Pronunciation of English /r/):
 postalveolar approximant  (the most common realization of the  phoneme, occurring in most dialects, RP and General American included)
 retroflex approximant  (occurs in most Irish dialects and some American dialects)
 labiodental approximant  (occurs in south-east England and some London accents; known as r-labialization)
 alveolar trill  (occurs in some very conservative Scottish dialects and some Indian, South African and Welsh accents)
 voiced uvular fricative  (occurs in northern Northumbria, largely disappeared; known as the Northumbrian burr)
 In most dialects  is labialized  in many positions, as in reed  and tree ; in the latter case, the  may be slightly labialized as well.
 In some rhotic accents, such as General American,  when not followed by a vowel is realized as an r-coloring of the preceding vowel or its coda: nurse , butter .
 The distinctions between the nasals are neutralized in some environments. For example, before a final ,  or  there is nearly always only one nasal sound that can appear in each case: ,  or  respectively (as in the words limp, lint, link – note that the n of link is pronounced ). For other possible syllable-final combinations, see  in the Phonotactics section below.

Obstruents
In most dialects, the fortis stops and affricate  have various different allophones, and are distinguished from the lenis stops and affricate  by several phonetic features.
 The allophones of the fortes  include:
aspirated  when they occur in the onset of a stressed syllable, as in potato. In clusters involving a following liquid, the aspiration typically manifests as the devoicing of this liquid. These sounds are unaspirated  after  within the same syllable, as in stan, span, scan, and at the ends of syllables, as in mat, map, mac. The voiceless fricatives are always unaspirated, but a notable exception to this are English-speaking areas of Wales, where they are often aspirated.
 In many accents of English, fortis stops  are glottalized in some positions. This may be heard either as a glottal stop preceding the oral closure ("pre-glottalization" or "glottal reinforcement") or as a substitution of the glottal stop  for the oral stop (glottal replacement).  can only be pre-glottalized. Pre-glottalization normally occurs in British and American English when the fortis consonant phoneme is followed by another consonant or when the consonant is in final position. Glottal replacement often happens in cases such as those just given, so that football is frequently pronounced .
 Among stops, both fortes and lenes:
 May have no audible release  in the word-final position. These allophones are more common in North America than Great Britain.
 Always have a 'masked release' before another plosive or affricate (as in rubbed ), i.e. the release of the first stop is made after the closure of the second stop. This also applies when the following stop is homorganic (articulated in the same place), as in top player. A notable exception to this is Welsh English, where stops are usually released in this environment.
 The affricates  have a mandatory fricative release in all environments.
 Very often in the United States and Canada, and less frequently in Australia and New Zealand, both  can be pronounced as a voiced flap  in certain positions: when they come between a preceding stressed vowel (possibly with intervening ) and precede an unstressed vowel or syllabic . Examples include water, bottle, petal, peddle (the last two words sound alike when flapped). The flap may even appear at word boundaries, as in put it on.
Yod-coalescence in stressed syllables, such as in tune and dune, occurs in Australian, Cockney, Estuary English, Hiberno-English (some speakers), Newfoundland English, South African English, and to a certain extent in New Zealand English and Scottish English (many speakers). This can lead to additional homophony; for instance, dew and due come to be pronounced the same as Jew.
In Australian English for example, assume is pronounced  by some speakers. Furthermore, some British, Canadian, American, New Zealand and Australian speakers may change the  sound to  before , so that a word having a cluster of  like in strewn would be pronounced . 
 The postalveolar consonants  are strongly labialized: .

Vowels
English, much like other Germanic languages, has a particularly large number of vowel phonemes, and in addition the vowels of English differ considerably between dialects. Consequently, corresponding vowels may be transcribed with various symbols depending on the dialect under consideration. When considering English as a whole, lexical sets are often used, each named by a word containing the vowel or vowels in question. The " vowel" then refers to the vowel that appears in those words in whichever dialect is being considered, or (at a greater level of abstraction) to a diaphoneme, which represents this interdialectal correspondence. A commonly used system of lexical sets, devised by John C. Wells, is presented below; for each set, the corresponding phonemes are given for RP and General American, using the notation that will be used on this page.

For a table that shows the pronunciations of these vowels in a wider range of English dialects, see IPA chart for English dialects.

The following tables show the vowel phonemes of three standard varieties of English. The notation system used here for Received Pronunciation (RP) is fairly standard; the others less so. The feature descriptions given here (front, close, etc.) are abstracted somewhat; the actual pronunciations of these vowels are somewhat more accurately conveyed by the IPA symbols used (see Vowel for a chart indicating the meanings of these symbols; though note also the points listed below the following tables). The symbols given in the table are traditional but redirect to their modern implementation.

The differences between these tables can be explained as follows:
 General American lacks a phoneme corresponding to RP , instead using  in the  words and generally  in the  words.
The symbol  continues to be used for reasons of tradition (it was historically a back vowel) and because it is still back in other varieties.
 RP transcriptions use  rather than  largely for convenience and historical tradition; it does not necessarily represent a different sound from the General American phoneme, although the RP vowel may be described as somewhat less open than the American one.
 The triphthongs given in the RP table are usually regarded as sequences of two phonemes (a diphthong plus ); however, in RP, these sequences frequently undergo smoothing into single diphthongs or even monophthongs.
 Both Australian  and RP  are long monophthongs, the difference between them being in tongue height: Australian  is close-mid , whereas the corresponding RP vowel is open-mid .

Other points to be noted are these:
 The vowel  is coming to be pronounced more open (approaching ) by many modern RP speakers. In American speech, however, there is a tendency for it to become more closed, tenser and even diphthongized (to something like ), particularly in certain environments, such as before a nasal consonant. See :/æ/ raising.
 A significant number of words (the  group) have  in General American, but  in RP.
 In General American and Canadian (which are rhotic accents, where  is pronounced in positions where it does not precede a vowel), many of the vowels can be r-colored by way of realization of a following . Alternatively, the  sequence might be written  to indicate an r-colored offglide.
 In modern RP and other dialects, many words from the  group are coming to be pronounced by an increasing number of speakers with the  vowel (so sure is often pronounced like shore).
In General American, the pronunciation varies between a monophthong and a diphthong.

Allophones of vowels
Listed here are some of the significant cases of allophony of vowels found within standard English dialects.
Vowels are shortened when followed in a syllable by a voiceless (fortis) consonant. This is known as pre-fortis clipping. Thus in the following word pairs the first item has a shortened vowel while the second has a normal length vowel: 'right'  – 'ride' ; 'face'  – 'phase' ; 'advice'  – 'advise' .
In standard Australian English the vowel  is similarly backed to  before . A similar phenomenon may occur in Southern American English.
 The vowel  is often pronounced  in open syllables.
 The  and  diphthongs may be pronounced with a less open starting point when followed by a voiceless consonant; this is chiefly a feature of Canadian speech (Canadian raising), but is also found in parts of the United States.

Unstressed syllables

Unstressed syllables in English may contain almost any vowel, but in practice vowels in stressed and unstressed syllables tend to use different inventories of phonemes. In particular, long vowels are used less often in unstressed syllables than stressed syllables. Additionally there are certain sounds—characterized by central position and weakness—that are particularly often found as the nuclei of unstressed syllables. These include:
This sound is essentially restricted to unstressed syllables exclusively. In the approach presented here it is identified as a phoneme , although other analyses do not have a separate phoneme for schwa and regard it as a reduction or neutralization of other vowels in syllables with the lowest degree of stress.
 syllabic consonants:  as in bottle,  as in button,  as in rhythm.
 , as in roses and making. (The OED has recently adopted the symbol  to indicate such cases.)
Some speakers may also have a rounded schwa, used in words like omission .
 , as in happy, coffee, in many dialects (others have  in this position). The phonemic status of this  is not easy to establish. See also happy-tensing.
 , as in influence, to each. This is the back rounded counterpart to  described above; its phonemic status is treated in the same works as cited there.

Vowel reduction in unstressed syllables is a significant feature of English. Syllables of the types listed above often correspond to a syllable containing a different vowel ("full vowel") used in other forms of the same morpheme where that syllable is stressed. For example, the first o in photograph, being stressed, is pronounced with the  vowel, but in photography, where it is unstressed, it is reduced to schwa. Also, certain common words (a, an, of, for, etc.) are pronounced with a schwa when they are unstressed, although they have different vowels when they are in a stressed position (see Weak and strong forms in English).

Some unstressed syllables, however, retain full (unreduced) vowels, i.e. vowels other than those listed above. Some phonologists regard such syllables as not being fully unstressed (they may describe them as having tertiary stress); some dictionaries have marked such syllables as having secondary stress. However linguists such as Ladefoged and  regard this as a difference purely of vowel quality and not of stress, and thus argue that vowel reduction itself is phonemic in English.

Lexical stress

Lexical stress is phonemic in English. For example, the noun increase and the verb increase are distinguished by the positioning of the stress on the first syllable in the former, and on the second syllable in the latter. (See initial-stress-derived noun.) Stressed syllables in English are louder than non-stressed syllables, as well as being longer and having a higher pitch.

In traditional approaches, in any English word consisting of more than one syllable, each syllable is ascribed one of three degrees of stress: primary, secondary or unstressed. Ordinarily, in each such word there will be exactly one syllable with primary stress, possibly one syllable having secondary stress, and the remainder are unstressed (unusually-long words may have multiple syllables with secondary stress). For example, the word amazing has primary stress on the second syllable, while the first and third syllables are unstressed, whereas the word organization has primary stress on the fourth syllable, secondary stress on the first, and the second, third, and fifth unstressed. This is often shown in pronunciation keys using the IPA symbols for primary and secondary stress (which are ˈ and ˌ respectively), placed before the syllables to which they apply.

Some analysts identify an additional level of stress (tertiary stress). (The precise identification of secondary and tertiary stress differs between analyses; dictionaries do not generally show tertiary stress, although some have taken the approach of marking all syllables with unreduced vowels as having at least secondary stress.)

In some analyses, then, the concept of lexical stress may become conflated with that of vowel reduction. An approach which attempts to separate these two is provided by Peter Ladefoged, who states that it is possible to describe English with only one degree of stress, as long as unstressed syllables are phonemically distinguished for vowel reduction. In this approach, the distinction between primary and secondary stress is regarded as a phonetic or prosodic detail rather than a phonemic feature – primary stress is seen as an example of the predictable "tonic" stress that falls on the final stressed syllable of a prosodic unit. For more details of this analysis, see Stress and vowel reduction in English.

Phonotactics
Phonotactics is the study of the sequences of phonemes that occur in languages and the sound structures that they form. In this study it is usual to represent consonants in general with the letter C and vowels with the letter V, so that a syllable such as 'be' is described as having CV structure. The IPA symbol used to show a division between syllables is the full stop . Syllabification is the process of dividing continuous speech into discrete syllables, a process in which the position of a syllable division is not always easy to decide upon.

This is the analysis used in the Longman Pronunciation Dictionary. However, this view is not widely accepted, as explained in the following section.

Syllable structure
From the phonetic point of view, the analysis of syllable structures is a complex task: because of widespread occurrences of articulatory overlap, English speakers rarely produce an audible release of individual consonants in consonant clusters. This coarticulation can lead to articulatory gestures that seem very much like deletions or complete assimilations. For example, hundred pounds may sound like  and jumped back (in slow speech) may sound like , but X-ray and electropalatographic studies demonstrate that inaudible and possibly weakened contacts or lingual gestures may still be made. Thus the second  in hundred pounds does not entirely assimilate to a labial place of articulation, rather the labial gesture co-occurs with the alveolar one; the "missing"  in jumped back may still be articulated, though not heard.

Division into syllables is a difficult area, and different theories have been proposed. A widely accepted approach is the maximal onset principle: this states that, subject to certain constraints, any consonants in between vowels should be assigned to the following syllable. Thus the word leaving should be divided  rather than *, and hasty is  rather than * or *. However, when such a division results in an onset cluster which is not allowed in English, the division must respect this. Thus if the word extra were divided * the resulting onset of the second syllable would be , a cluster which does not occur initially in English. The division  is therefore preferred. If assigning a consonant or consonants to the following syllable would result in the preceding syllable ending in an unreduced short vowel, this is avoided. Thus the word comma (in RP) should be divided  and not *, even though the latter division gives the maximal onset to the following syllable.

Some phonologists have suggested a compromise analysis where the consonant in the middle belongs to both syllables, and is described as ambisyllabic. Where the division coincides with a word boundary, or the boundary between elements of a compound word, it is not usual in the case of dictionaries to insist on the maximal onset principle in a way that divides words in a counter-intuitive way; thus the word hardware would be divided  by the M.O.P., but dictionaries prefer the division .

In the approach used by the Longman Pronunciation Dictionary, Wells claims that consonants syllabify with the preceding rather than following vowel when the preceding vowel is the nucleus of a more salient syllable, with stressed syllables being the most salient, reduced syllables the least, and full unstressed vowels ("secondary stress") intermediate. But there are lexical differences as well, frequently but not exclusively with compound words. Similarly, in toe-strap Wells argues that the second  is a full plosive, as usual in syllable onset, whereas in toast-rack the second  is in many dialects reduced to the unreleased allophone it takes in syllable codas, or even elided:  → ; likewise nitrate  →  with a voiceless  (and for some people an affricated tr as in tree), vs night-rate  →  with a voiced .

Onset
The following can occur as the onset:

Notes:

Other onsets

Certain English onsets appear only in contractions: e.g. An archaic voiceless fricative plus nasal exists,  (fnese), as does an archaic  (snew).

Some clusters of this type can be converted to regular English phonotactics by simplifying the cluster: e.g.

Nucleus
The following can occur as the nucleus:
All vowel sounds
 in rhotic varieties of English (e.g. General American) in certain situations (see below under word-level patterns)

Coda

He argues that the traditional assumption that pre-vocalic consonants form a syllable with the following vowel is due to the influence of languages like French and Latin, where syllable structure is CVC.CVC regardless of stress placement. Disregarding such contentious cases, which do not occur at the ends of words, the following sequences can occur as the coda:

Notes:

For some speakers, a fricative before  is elided so that these never appear phonetically:  becomes ,  becomes ,  or  becomes .

Syllable-level patterns
Syllables may consist of a single vowel, meaning that onset and coda are not mandatory.
The consonant  does not occur in syllable-initial position (except in unassimilated loans like Ngorongoro).
The consonant  does not occur in syllable-final position.
Long vowels and diphthongs are not found before , except for the mimetic words boing and oink, unassimilated foreign words such as Burmese aung and proper names such as Taung, and American-type pronunciations of words like strong (which have  or ). The short vowels  occur before  only in assimilated non-native words such as ginseng and Song (name of a Chinese dynasty) or non-finally in some dialects in words like strength and length as well as in varieties without the foot-strut split.
 Stop +  before  (all presently or historically ) are excluded.

Word-level patterns
 does not occur in stressed syllables, unless it is merged with another vowel as in some varieties.
 does not occur in word-initial position in native English words, although it can occur syllable-initially as in luxurious  in American English, and at the start of borrowed words such as genre.
Such syllables are often analyzed phonemically as having an underlying  as the nucleus. See above under Consonants.
The short vowels are checked vowels, in that they cannot occur without a coda in a word-final stressed syllable.

Prosody
The prosodic features of English – stress, rhythm, and intonation – can be described as follows.

Prosodic stress
Prosodic stress is extra stress given to words or syllables when they appear in certain positions in an utterance, or when they receive special emphasis.

This is said to be the origin of the distinction traditionally made at the lexical level between primary and secondary stress: when a word like admiration (traditionally transcribed as something like ) is spoken in isolation, or at the end of a sentence, the syllable ra (the final stressed syllable) is pronounced with greater force than the syllable ad, although when the word is not pronounced with this final intonation there may be no difference between the levels of stress of these two syllables.

Prosodic stress can shift for various pragmatic functions, such as focus or contrast. For instance, in the dialogue Is it brunch tomorrow? No, it's dinner tomorrow, the extra stress shifts from the last stressed syllable of the sentence, tomorrow, to the last stressed syllable of the emphasized word, dinner.

Grammatical function words are usually prosodically unstressed, although they can acquire stress when emphasized (as in Did you find the cat? Well, I found a cat). Many English function words have distinct strong and weak pronunciations; for example, the word a in the last example is pronounced , while the more common unstressed a is pronounced . See Weak and strong forms in English.

Rhythm
English is claimed to be a stress-timed language. That is, stressed syllables tend to appear with a more or less regular rhythm, while non-stressed syllables are shortened to accommodate this. For example, in the sentence One make of car is better than another, the syllables one, make, car, bett- and  will be stressed and relatively long, while the other syllables will be considerably shorter. The theory of stress-timing predicts that each of the three unstressed syllables in between bett- and  will be shorter than the syllable of between make and car, because three syllables must fit into the same amount of time as that available for of. However, it should not be assumed that all varieties of English are stress-timed in this way. The English spoken in the West Indies, in Africa and in India are probably better characterized as syllable-timed, though the lack of an agreed scientific test for categorizing an accent or language as stress-timed or syllable-timed may lead one to doubt the value of such a characterization.

Intonation

Phonological contrasts in intonation can be said to be found in three different and independent domains. In the work of Halliday the following names are proposed:

Tonality for the distribution of continuous speech into tone groups.
Tonicity for the placing of the principal accent on a particular syllable of a word, making it the tonic syllable. This is the domain also referred to as prosodic stress or sentence stress.
Tone for the choice of pitch movement on the tonic syllable. (The use of the term tone in this sense should not be confused with the tone of tone languages, such as Chinese.)

These terms ("the Three Ts") have been used in more recent work, though they have been criticized for being difficult to remember. American systems such as ToBI also identify contrasts involving boundaries between intonation phrases (Halliday's tonality), placement of pitch accent (tonicity), and choice of tone or tones associated with the pitch accent (tone).

Example of phonological contrast involving placement of intonation unit boundaries (boundary marked by comma):

Example of phonological contrast involving placement of tonic syllable (marked by capital letters):

Example of phonological contrast (British English) involving choice of tone (\ = falling tone, \/ = fall-rise tone)

There is typically a contrast involving tone between wh-questions and yes/no questions, the former having a falling tone (e.g. "Where did you \PUT it?") and the latter a rising tone (e.g. "Are you going /OUT?"), though studies of spontaneous speech have shown frequent exceptions to this rule. Tag questions asking for information are said to carry rising tones (e.g. "They are coming on Tuesday, /AREN'T they?") while those asking for confirmation have falling tone (e.g. "Your name's John, \ISN'T it.").

History of English pronunciation

The pronunciation system of English has undergone many changes throughout the history of the language, from the phonological system of Old English, to that of Middle English, through to that of the present day. Variation between dialects has always been significant. Former pronunciations of many words are reflected in their spellings, as English orthography has generally not kept pace with phonological changes since the Middle English period.

The English consonant system has been relatively stable over time, although a number of significant changes have occurred.

The development of vowels has been much more complex. One of the most notable series of changes is that known as the Great Vowel Shift, which began around the late 14th century. These shifts are responsible for the modern pronunciations of many written vowel combinations, including those involving a silent final .

Many other changes in vowels have taken place over the centuries (see the separate articles on the low back, high back and high front vowels, short A, and diphthongs). These various changes mean that many words that formerly rhymed (and may be expected to rhyme based on their spelling) no longer do. In other cases, words that were formerly distinct have come to be pronounced the same – examples of such mergers include meet–meat, pane–pain and toe–tow.

Controversial issues

Velar nasal
It still feels like ƞg."

 1.  →  /   velar consonant 
 2.  → ∅ /  _

These produce the following results:

                                   
However, these rules do not predict the following phonetic forms:

The words are all single morphemes, unlike singer and singing which are composed of two morphemes, sing plus -er or -ing. Rule 2 can be amended to include a symbol # for a morpheme boundary (including word boundary):

2.  /ɡ/ → ∅ / [ŋ] ___  #

This rule then applies to sing, singer and singing but not to anger, finger, or hunger.

According to this rule, the words hangar ('shed for aircraft'), which contains no internal morpheme boundary, and hanger ('object for hanging clothes'), which comprises two morphemes, are expected to constitute a minimal pair as hangar  versus hanger ; in actuality, their pronunciations are not consistently distinguished in this manner, as hangar is frequently pronounced .

Additionally, there are exceptions in the form of comparative and superlative forms of adjectives, where Rule 2 must be prevented from applying. The ending -ish is another possible exception.

 

As a result, there is, in theory, a minimal pair consisting of longer ( 'more long') and longer ( 'person who longs'), though it is doubtful that native speakers make this distinction regularly.  Names of persons and places, and loanwords, are less predictable. Singapore may be pronounced with or without ; bungalow usually has ; and Inge may or may not have .

Vowel system
It is often stated that English has a particularly large number of vowel phonemes and that there are 20 vowel phonemes in Received Pronunciation, 14–16 in General American, and 20–21 in Australian English. These numbers, however, reflect just one of many possible phonological analyses. A number of "biphonemic" analyses have proposed that English has a basic set of short (sometimes called "simple" or "checked") vowels, each of which can be shown to be a phoneme and which can be combined with another phoneme to form long vowels and diphthongs. One of these biphonemic analyses asserts that diphthongs and long vowels may be interpreted as comprising a short vowel linked to a consonant.

The analysis from  came out of a desire to build an "overall system" to accommodate all English dialects, with dialectal distinctions arising from differences in the ordering of phonological rules, as well as in the presence or absence of such rules. Another category of biphonemic analyses of English treats long vowels and diphthongs as conjunctions of two vowels. In , for example, there are seven basic vowels and these may be doubled (geminated) to represent long vowels, as shown in the table below:

The vowel inventory of English RP in MacCarthy's system therefore totals only seven phonemes. Analyses such as these could also posit six vowel phonemes, if the vowel of the final syllable in comma is considered to be an unstressed allophone of that of strut. Six or seven vowels is a figure that would put English much closer to the average number of vowel phonemes in other languages.

A radically different approach to the English vowel system was proposed by Chomsky and Halle. Their Sound Pattern of English  proposed that English has lax and tense vowel phonemes which are operated on by a complex set of phonological rules to transform underlying phonological forms into surface phonetic representations. This generative analysis is not easily comparable with conventional analyses, but the total number of vowel phonemes proposed falls well short of the figure of 20 often claimed as the number of English vowel phonemes.

See also

 Australian English phonology
 English orthography
 English pronunciation of Greek letters
 General American
 Non-native pronunciations of English
 Old English phonology
 Perception of English /r/ and /l/ by Japanese speakers
 Phonological development
 Phonological history of English vowels
 Phonological history of English consonants
 Pronunciation of English ⟨th⟩
 Received Pronunciation
 Regional accents of English
 Rhoticity in English
 T-glottalization
 R-colored vowel
 International Phonetic Alphabet chart for English dialects
 :Category:Splits and mergers in English phonology

Notes

References

Citations

Sources

Further reading

Campbell, F., Gick, B., Wilson, I., Vatikiotis-Bateson, E. (2010), “Spatial and Temporal Properties of Gestures in North American English /r/”. Child's Language and Speech, 53 (1): 49–69

Dalcher Villafaña, C., Knight, R.A., Jones, M.J., (2008), “Cue Switching in the Perception of Approximants: Evidence from Two English Dialects”. University of Pennsylvania Working Papers in Linguistics, 14 (2): 63–64
Espy-Wilson, C. (2004), “Articulatory Strategies, speech Acoustics and Variability”. From Sound to Sense June 11 – June 13 at MIT: 62–63

Hagiwara, R., Fosnot, S. M., & Alessi, D. M. (2002). “Acoustic phonetics in a clinical setting: A case study of /r/-distortion therapy with surgical intervention”. Clinical linguistics & phonetics, 16 (6): 425–441.

Hoff, Erika, (2009), Language Development. Scarborough, Ontario. Cengage Learning, 2005.
Howard, S. (2007), “The interplay between articulation and prosody in children with impaired speech: Observations from electropalatographic and perceptual analysis”. International Journal of Speech-Language Pathology, 9 (1): 20–35.

Locke, John L., (1983), Phonological Acquisition and Change. New York, United States. Academic Press, 1983. Print.

Sharf, D.J., Benson, P.J. (1982), “Identification of synthesized/r-w/continua for adult and child speakers”. Donald J. Acoustical Society of America, 71 (4):1008–1015.
Wise, Claude Merton (1957), Applied Phonetics, Englewood Cliffs, NJ:  Prentice-Hall.

External links

University of Glasgow Dynamic Dialects Accent Map